Christian Gille (born 6 January 1979 in Wolfen) is a German flatwater canoeist who has competed since the mid-1990s.

A junior world champion (C-4 1000 m) in 1993, he won two senior world championship gold medals with Thomas Zereske in the C-2 200 m sprint in 1997 and 1998. They also competed at the Sydney Olympics in 2000, placing fifth in the C-2 500 m final.

In 2002 Gille won the only C-1 world championship medal of his career. He crossed the line in fourth place in the C-1 200 m final in Seville, Spain, but was later awarded the bronze medal after Ukrainian Dmytro Sablin tested positive for cannabis. Of more significance for the future however was the formation that year of a new C-2 partnership with 19-year-old Tomasz Wylenzek. They finished third in the European Championships and seventh in the C-2 500 m in Seville.

Two years later they won a surprise gold medal in the C-2 1000m. Gille wore a black armband in memory of his former partner Thomas Zereske who had died earlier that summer.

In 2005 Gille and Wylenzek completely dominated the C-2 event. A clean sweep of medals (200 m, 500 m and 1000 m) at the European Championships in Poznań, Poland, in May was followed by two golds (500m and 1000m) at the World Championships in Zagreb.

2006 proved a disappointment after the highs of the previous two years. Replaced by Stefan Holtz and Robert Nuck as Germany's C-2 500 m representatives, they were therefore unable to defend their European and world titles over that distance. They also lost their other titles in competition, coming away with just two silver medals at the major championships (European C-2 1000 m and world C-2 200 m), compared with the five golds of 2005.

Gille won two more Olympic medals at Beijing in 2008 with a silver in the C-2 1000 m and a bronze in the C-2 500 m events.

Gille is a member of the Leipzig club.

References
 
 
 Wallechinsky, David and Jaime Loucky (2008). "Canoeing: Men's Canadian Pairs 1000 Meters". In The Complete Book of the Olympics: 2008 Edition. London: Aurum Press Limited. p. 484.

External links
 
 

1979 births
Living people
People from Bitterfeld-Wolfen
German male canoeists
Canoeists at the 2000 Summer Olympics
Canoeists at the 2004 Summer Olympics
Canoeists at the 2008 Summer Olympics
Olympic canoeists of Germany
Olympic gold medalists for Germany
Olympic silver medalists for Germany
Olympic bronze medalists for Germany
Olympic medalists in canoeing
ICF Canoe Sprint World Championships medalists in Canadian
Medalists at the 2008 Summer Olympics
Medalists at the 2004 Summer Olympics
Sportspeople from Saxony-Anhalt